The Alpha League was a high school athletic conference affiliated with the CIF Southern Section. Its members are all independent schools located from west Los Angeles to the valley in the district of Los Angeles, California.

Members
 Brentwood School
 Campbell Hall School
 Paraclete High School
 Sierra Canyon School
 Viewpoint School	
 Windward School
 Crossroads School

References

CIF Southern Section leagues